Aleksandr Lyubaturov (Russian: Александр Любатуров; born 4 April 1942) is a Soviet rower. He competed at the 1972 Summer Olympics in Munich with the men's coxed four where they came fourth.

References

External links 
 
 

1942 births
Living people
Soviet male rowers
Olympic rowers of the Soviet Union
Rowers at the 1972 Summer Olympics